The Sa Pereira accident was a train wreck in the city of Sa Pereira in Santa Fe Province which occurred on 25 February 1978, when a long-distance passenger train operated by Ferrocarriles Argentinos crashed into a truck at a level crossing between the General Mitre Railway and RN 19 in Sa Pereira.

Leaving 55 people dead, it was the worst rail tragedy in the province of Santa Fe, and the second biggest accident in the history of rail transport in Argentina, after the Benavídez rail disaster of 1970 which left 236 dead.

Overview 

The incident happened at 7:22 am on Saturday February 25, 1978, when in the middle of the sound of the siren announcing an approaching train, a long-distance bus and a Ford F-600 truck carrying a load of 25,000 kg of edible fat and cans, drove through the level crossing despite the red flashing lights and the sound of the bell indicating the train was nearby.

The truck, owned by meat packing industry "Santa Elena" and driven by 35-year-old Arnaldo Ruben Bianchini, was hit by the Estrella del Norte ("Northern Star", as the passenger service was called) that had departed from San Miguel de Tucumán running towards Retiro Station (terminus of the line). At the moment of the impact, the train was carrying 2,130 passengers.

The train, driven by Antonio Gore, could not avoid the crash: the locomotive derailed and collapsed parallel to the tracks, following its route for hundreds of meters until two passenger cars in the center of the train embedded themselves into the ground. As a result, many passengers were struck into the cars. Those ones which suffered minor injuries could escape from the coaches jumping from the windows, but many others could not be rescued until special machines and tools to cut the coaches open arrived from nearby cities of the region.

Immediately, local residents and several of the passengers of the train began to assist with the rescue process. Police and firefighters arrivied from neighbouring towns San Jerónimo, Esperanza, San Francisco, Rafaela, Gálvez, Rosario, Santa Fe, Paraná and others to aid the rescue.

Many bodies could not be identified and were buried in a common grave.

References

1978 in Argentina
Train collisions in Argentina
Railway accidents in 1978
Rail transport in Santa Fe Province
1978 disasters in Argentina